Adam Eric Pothier (born August 3, 1979 in Calgary, Alberta) is a Canadian luger who has competed since 1990. Competing in two Winter Olympics, he earned his best finish of fifth in the men's doubles event at Salt Lake City in 2002.  He is a 6 time National Champion in the Doubles category.  Pothier officially retired from the sport in January 2009.

Pothier's best finish in the FIL World Luge Championships was ninth in the men's doubles event at Nagano in 2004. He resides in Airdrie, Alberta and studied at the University of Calgary. Graduated in June 2013 with a Bachelor of Arts in Economics and a minor in Business.

Best Results: 
10th 2000 FIL Luge World Championships St. Moritz, Switzerland. Doubles 
4th World Cup Calgary, Canada 2001. Doubles 
2nd Challenge Cup Calgary, Canada 2001. Doubles 
5th 2002 Winter Olympic Games Salt Lake City, USA. Doubles 
4th World Cup Salt Lake City, USA 2002. Doubles 
4th World Cup Calgary 2002. Doubles 
3rd World Cup Overall 02/03. Combined 
7th World Cup Overall 02/03. Doubles 
20th World Cup Igls, Austria. Singles 
9th 2004 FIL Luge World Championships Nagano, Japan. Doubles

10th 2006 Winter Olympic Games Torino, Italy. Doubles

References
2002 luge men's doubles results
2006 luge men's doubles results
Canoe.ca profile prior to the 2006 Winter Olympics
FIL-Luge profile
Radio-Canada.ca profile

External links 
 
 
 
 

1979 births
Living people
Canadian male lugers
Olympic lugers of Canada
Lugers at the 2002 Winter Olympics
Lugers at the 2006 Winter Olympics
People from Airdrie, Alberta
Lugers from Calgary